Vera Valeryevna Sobetova (born 10 March 1992) is a Russian sprint canoeist. Sobetova represented Russia at the 2012 Summer Olympics in London, where she competed only in sprint kayak doubles and four. For her first event, the women's K-4 500 metres, Sobetova and her teammates Yuliana Salakhova, Natalia Podolskaya, and Yulia Kachalova finished seventh in the final by six thousandths of a second (0.006) behind the Portuguese team (led by Teresa Portela), with a time of 1:33.459. The following day, Sobetova and her partner Natalia Lobova paddled to a seventh-place finish and fifteenth overall in the B-final of the women's K-2 500 metres, by nineteen hundredths of a second (0.19) ahead of the Romanian pair Irina Lauric and Iuliana Paleu, posting their time of 1:52.277.

References

External links
NBC Olympics Profile

1992 births
Russian female canoeists
Living people
Olympic canoeists of Russia
Canoeists at the 2012 Summer Olympics
Sportspeople from Lipetsk
European Games competitors for Russia
Canoeists at the 2015 European Games
Canoeists at the 2019 European Games